The Indore Metro is a rapid transit system which is under construction for the city of Indore, India. The cost per km will be 182 crores and total cost is 15,000 crores. The metro system will be elevated, underground and on ground.
The Indore Metro project has been subject to serious contestation due to the inappropriate shifting of Seismic zone-II to Seismic zone-IV category which has led to increase in budgetary cost for the entire project.

Plan
Six corridors have been proposed by DMRC. The main corridors are:
 Annapurna to Sukhliya
 Super Corridor MR 10 to Ring Road
 Niranjanpur to Bhawarkuwa

The planned Metro in Indore is  Metro system which is designed by Rohit Associates Cities & Rails Private Limited, headed by architect Rohit Gupta. This system consists of a Network of 100–107  km and with lines overlapping and branching. In May 2013, Rohit Associates was appointed to prepare a detailed project report for the MRTS including the selection of the system for the city. Based on the multi-criteria analysis and recommendations of consultant Rohit Associates, The Government of Madhya Pradesh approved the inception report prepared by the consultant on 30 June 2014. , Geotechnical surveys and formation of the company is being carried on for the implementation of the project. The project is projected to be completed by 2024.

On 9 October 2015, the then Madhya Pradesh Chief Minister Shivraj Singh Chouhan had claimed to have received consent from Japan International Cooperation Agency (JICA) for Rs 12,000 crore loan at 0.3 percent interest rate for Bhopal and Indore Metro rail projects. However, during an update on 7 March 2017 it was revealed by state’s Urban Administration and Development Minister Maya Singh that JICA has refused to fund the metro projects of Bhopal and Indore.

After the JICA’s refusal to fund the metro projects of Bhopal and Indore, the state government has sent a proposal to the Centre to get the funding from the bilateral/multilateral financial institutions.

On 1 May 2019, the Asian Development Bank (ADB) gave in-principle approval to fund the Indore Metro project. The Union Government will stand as guarantor for the loan.

Route Network
In Phase 1, Yellow Line consists of 29 stations.

(Bhawarsala Square - Super Corridor 1)
Length: 33.53 km

Alignment: Elevated & Underground

No. of Stations: 29

Stations:
Bhawarsala Square
MR 10 Road
ISBT/MR10 Flyover
Chandragupta Square
Hira Nagar
Bapat Square
Meghdoot Square
Vijay Nagar Square 
Radisson Square
Mumtaj Bag Colony
Khajrana Square
Bengali Square
Patrakar Colony
Palasia Square
Hight Court
Indore Railway Station
Rajwada
Chota Ganapathi
Bada Ganapathi
Ramchandra Nagar
BSF/Kalani Nagar
Airport 
Gandhi Nagar
Super Corridor 6
Super Corridor 5
Super Corridor 4
Super Corridor 3
Super Corridor 2
Super Corridor 1

Status updates
 Oct 2018: DPR prepared by Rohit Associates Cities & Rails Pvt. Ltd. is approved by central government.
 Aug 2019: Memorandum of Understanding (MoU) signed between central and state governments for Bhopal and Indore metro. State and central governments will bear 20% of the project cost each and remaining 60% will be funded by international banks. Indore metro to be operational by 2023. Construction work is ongoing as of 21 August 2019.
 Aug 2020: Minister of Madhya Pradesh Government pushes to start the tendering and civil engineering work for Indore Metro so that it can be inaugurated before August 2023.
Mar 2021: Construction of Elevated Viaduct Between ISBT/MR10 And Mumtaj Bagh Colony Construction facing issues and delays due to disputes between GC and Dilip Buildcon. Tenders for construction of 9 Elevated Metro Stations and Elevated Viaduct on Line 3 (Yellow Line) from MR10 Road Station to Gandhi Nagar Station (10.9 km) and 7 Elevated Metro Stations and Elevated Viaduct on Line 3 (Yellow Line) from ISBT to Radisson Square are released and bids are invited. Soil testing for underground metro from Airport to Gandhi Hall begins.
Dec 2021: Foundation stone for construction of 11 km viaduct of Phase I ring-line (total 31 kms) laid again, along with proposed construction of 16 metro stations which are cumulatively worth Rs. 1,417 crores. Rail Vikas Nigam Limited (RVNL) has been awarded both the contracts. 16 firms submit bids for construction of Metro Depot at Gandhinagar. Contentions over shifting of Indore metro project in Seismic zone-IV category with allegations of benefiting certain business houses, continue to reflect fault lines and the future loss of revenue which government might suffer.

See also 
 Urban rail transit in India
 Bhoj Metro
 Indore Monorail

References

Notes

External links
Bhopal, Indore to have Metro Rail soon 
Metro rail facility soon in Bhopal

Proposed rapid transit in India
Standard gauge railways in India
Transport in Indore
Companies based in Indore